Cassiers may refer to

Henri Cassiers (1858–1944), Belgian illustrator
Guy Cassiers (born 1960), Belgian theatre  director

See also
Cassier's Magazine, 1891 to 1913